Robert William Sadek Jr. (August 26, 1942 – May 31, 2013) was an American football player and coach. He served as the head football coach at Hamline University in Saint Paul, Minnesota in 1977, compiling a record of 2–7. Sadek played college football at the University of Minnesota, where he was the starting quarterback in 1963.

Head coaching record

References

1942 births
2013 deaths
American football quarterbacks
Hamline Pipers football coaches
Macalester Scots baseball coaches
Macalester Scots football coaches
Minnesota Golden Gophers football coaches
Minnesota Golden Gophers football players
New Mexico State Aggies football coaches
Northern Michigan Wildcats football coaches
High school football coaches in Minnesota
Junior college football coaches in the United States
Sports coaches from Minneapolis
Players of American football from Minneapolis